The Eastern Zone was one of the three regional zones of the 1959 Davis Cup.

8 teams entered the Eastern Zone, with the winner going on to compete in the Inter-Zonal Zone against the winners of the America Zone and Europe Zone. India defeated the Philippines in the final and progressed to the Inter-Zonal Zone.

Draw

Quarterfinals

Japan vs. Ceylon

Philippines vs. Malaya

Semifinals

Japan vs. India

Thailand vs. Philippines

Final

India vs. Philippines

References

External links
Davis Cup official website

Davis Cup Asia/Oceania Zone
Eastern Zone
Davis Cup